Foreign Legion most often refers to:
 French Foreign Legion, a unit of the French Army

Foreign Legion may also refer to:

Military 
 Brigade of Gurkhas, light infantry unit of the British Army
 Foreign volunteers, a term for troops joining a foreign army
 International Brigades, of the Spanish Civil War
 International Legion, created in 1860 by Giuseppe Garibaldi
 International Freedom Battalion, a leftist foreign fighters fighting for the Rojava forces during the Syrian Civil War
 International Legion of Territorial Defense of Ukraine, a Ukrainian brigade created during the 2022 Russian invasion of Ukraine
 King's German Legion (KGL), a British Army unit of expatriate Germans during the Napoleonic Wars
 Mahal (Israel), foreigners serving in the Israeli army
 Polish Legions (Napoleonic period), Polish military units that served with the French Army, 1790s–1810s
 Portuguese Legion (Napoleonic Wars), a Portuguese military force in Napoleon's Imperial Armies
 Rhodesian Light Infantry, informally known as Rhodesian Foreign Legion (1961–1980)
 Royal Dutch East Indies Army (KNIL), informally known as Dutch Foreign Legion (1830–1950)
 Royal Sicilian Regiment (1806-1816)
 Russian–German Legion, a Russian Army unit of expatriate German personnel during the Napoleonic Wars
 Spanish Legion, a quasi-independent unit of the Spanish Army
 Värvat främlingsregemente, Recruited Foreigners Regiment, Swedish regiment of Polish deserters
 YPG International, foreign legion branches of the People's Protection Units (YPG).

Entertainment
The Foreign Legion, a 1928 silent film
Foreign Legion (band), a punk band from Wales
Foreign Legion (album), a 2002 album by Murfreesboro
Foreign Legion (Tin Hat album), a 2010 album by Tin Hat
Foreign Legion (wrestling) (La Legión Extranjera), a loosely affiliated group in Mexican wrestling
Foreign Legions, a 2001 anthology edited by David Drake

See also
Abbott and Costello in the Foreign Legion, a 1950 film
Tarzan and the Foreign Legion, a 1947 novel by Edgar Rice Burroughs
French Foreign Legion (disambiguation)
Legion (disambiguation)
List of military legions

Military units and formations disambiguation pages